Mark E. Biddle (born 1957) is the Russell T. Cherry Professor of Hebrew Bible/Old Testament at the Baptist Theological Seminary at Richmond in Richmond, Virginia. He is editor of the Review & Expositor journal.

Education
Biddle, a native of Fort Payne, Alabama, was educated in the public schools of DeKalb County, Alabama and Orange County, Florida. Biddle received a B.A. from Samford University in Homewood, Alabama, an M.Div. from the Southern Baptist Theological Seminary in Louisville, Kentucky, a Th.M. from International Baptist Theological Seminary of the European Baptist Federation in Prague, Czech Republic and a Dr. Theol. from the University of Zurich in Zürich, Switzerland.

Books

 A Redaction History of Jeremiah 2:1-4:2, Abhandlungen zur Theologie des Alten und Neuen Testaments 77. Zürich: TVZ, 1990.
 Polyphony and Symphony in Prophetic Literature: A Literary Analysis of Jeremiah 7-20, Studies in Old Testament Interpretation 2. Macon, GA: Mercer University Press, 1996.
 Deuteronomy, Smyth & Helwys Bible Commentary 4. Macon: Smyth & Helwys, 2003.
 Missing the Mark: Sin and Its Consequences in Biblical Theology. Nashville: Abingdon, 2005.
 Judges: Reading the Old Testament. Macon: Smyth & Helwys, 2012.
 A Time to Laugh: Humor in the Bible. Macon: Smyth & Helwys, 2013.

Articles in journals and collected works

 "The Literary Frame Surrounding Jeremiah 30:1-33:26," Zeitschrift für Alttestamentliche Wissenschaft 100 (1988): 409-413.
 "The 'Endangered Ancestress' and Blessing for the Nations," Journal of Biblical Literature (=JBL) 109 (1990): 599-611.
 "Christian Interpretation of the Old Testament: A Methodological Problem," Faculty Studies (Carson Newman College) 1990: 27-43.
 "The Figure of Lady Jerusalem: Identification, Deification and Personification of Cities in the Ancient Near East," in The Canon in Comparative Perspective, Scripture in Context IV, B. Batto, W. Hallo, and L. Younger, eds. Lewiston: New York: Mellen Press, 1991. pp. 173–194.
 "Bible Study Guide: The Book of Micah," Pulpit Digest 73/517 (1992): 77-81.
 "Lady Zion's Alter Egos: Isaiah 47:1-15 and 57:6-13 as Structural Counterparts," in New Visions of the Book of Isaiah, JSOTSup 214, R. Melugin and M. Sweeney, eds. Sheffield: JSOT Press, 1997. pp. 124–139.
 "The City of Chaos and the New Jerusalem: Isaiah 24-27 in Context," Perspectives in Religious Studies 22 (1995): 5-12.
 "Amos: Introduction," in Interpreting Amos for Teaching and Preaching. Macon: Smyth and Helwys, 1996.
 "Laboratory for Learning: Promoting Community Learning Across Curricular and Co-Curricular Functions," (with E. Lee and W. McDonald) in Who Teaches?  Who Learns?  Authentic Student/Faculty Partners, R. Jenkins and K. Romer, eds. Providence, RI: Ivy Publishers, 1998. pp. 69–76.
 "Literary Structures in the Book of Joshua," Review & Expositor (=RE) 95 (1998): 189-202.
 "'Israel' and 'Jacob' in the Book of Micah: Micah in the Context of the Twelve," in Society of Biblical Literature 1998 Seminar Papers Part Two. Atlanta: Society of Biblical Literature, 1998. pp. 850–871.
 Sermon ideas/summaries on select texts in Genesis for the 2001 edition of Abingdon's Ministers Manual.
 "Ancestral Motifs In 1 Samuel 25: Intertextuality and Characterization," JBL 121 (2002): 617-638.
 "Contingency, God, and the Babylonians: Jeremiah on the Complexity of Repentance," RE 101 (2004): 247-65.
 "A Word About Separation of Church and State," RE 101 (2004): 583-586.
 "Genesis 3: Sin, Shame and Self-Esteem," RE 103 (2006): 359-370.
 "Obadiah-Jonah-Micah in Canonical Context: The Nature of Prophetic Literature and Hermeneutics," Interpretation 61 (2007): 154-166.
 "Song of Songs: A Brief Annotated Bibliography," RE 105 (2008): 481 – 490.
 "Teaching Isaiah Today," PRS 36 (2009): 257-272.
 "The Biblical Prohibition Against Usury," Int 65 (2011): 117-127.
 "Joshua 24:1-3a, 14-25," Lectionary Homiletics 22/6 (October/November 2011): 41-42.
 "Judges 4:1-7," Lectionary Homiletics 22/6 (October/November 2011): 49-50.
 "Dominion Returns to Jerusalem: An Examination of Developments in the Kingship and Zion Traditions as Reflected in the Book of the Twelve with Particular Attention to Micah 4-5," in Perspectives on the Formation of the Book of the Twelve: Methodological Foundations, Redactional Processes, Historical Insights, BZAW 433. R. Albertz, J. Wöhrle, and J. Nogalski, eds.; Berlin: de Gruyter, 2012. pp. 253–267.

Dictionary articles

 "Murder," in The Mercer Dictionary of the Bible, Watson E. Mills, ed. Macon: MercerUniversity Press, 1990.
 "Redaction Criticism: Hebrew Bible," in Dictionary of Biblical Interpretation, John H. Hayes, ed. Nashville: Abingdon, 1999. pp. 373–376.
 "Jeremiah, Letter of Jeremiah, Baruch," Oxford Annotated Bible.  New York: Oxford University Press, 2001.
 "Execration," "Flesh in the OT," "Humor" and "Perish" in New Interpreter's Dictionary of the Bible, 5 vols., K. D. Sakenfeld, et al., eds. Nashville: Abingdon 2006–2009.
 "Sin," in Dictionary of Scripture and Ethics. Grand Rapids: Baker Academic (2009).
 "Deposit and Pledge," in The Oxford Encyclopedia of Bible and Law (forthcoming).

Translations

 Ernst Jenni and Claus Westermann, eds.  Theological Lexicon of the Old Testament. 3 vols. Peabody, MA: Hendrickson, 1997. (= Theologisches Handwörterbuch zum Alten Testament. 2 vols. Munich: Kaiser, 1984).
 Hermann Gunkel. Genesis. Mercer Library of Biblical Studies. Macon, GA: Mercer University Press, 1997.
 Martin Hengel. The Septuagint as Christian Scripture: Its Prehistory and the Problem of Its Canon. Edinburgh: T. & T. Clark, 2002. (= Die Septuaginta: Zwischen Judentum und Christentum. Tübingen: Mohr/Siebeck, 1994).
 Julius Wellhausen. The Pharisees and the Sadducees: An Examination of Internal Jewish History. Mercer Library of Biblical Studies. Macon, GA: Mercer University Press, 2001 (= Die Pharisäer und die Sadducäer: Eine Untersuchung zur inneren jüdischen Geschichte. 3rd ed. Göttingen: Vandenhoeck & Ruprecht, 1967).
 Otto Kaiser. The Old Testament Apocrypha: An Introduction to the Fundamentals. Peabody, MA: Hendrickson, 2004 (= Die alttestamentlichen Apokryphen: Eine Einleitung in Grundzügen. Gütersloh: Kaiser, 2000).
 Contributing translator to Religion, Past and Present (= Religion in Geschichte und Gegenwart, Leiden: Brill) Leiden: Brill, 2007ff.
 M. Hauger, "'But We Were in the Wilderness, and There God Speaks Quite Differently': On the Significance of Preaching in the Theology and Work of Gerhard von Rad" in Int 62 (2008): 278-292.
 Gerhard von Rad, "Sermon on Luke 24:13-35" in Int 52 (2008): 294-303.
 Reinhard Feldmeier and Hermann Spieckermann, God of the Living. Waco: Baylor, 2011. (= Der Gott der Lebendigen: Eine biblische Gotteslehre. Tübingen: Mohr/Siebeck, 2011.)
 Sigmund Mowinckel, Psalm Studies. 2 vols. SBL History of Biblical Studies 2, 3. Atlanta: SBL Press, 2014. (= Psalmenstudien. 6 vols. Kristiania: Dybwad, 1921-1924).
 Andreas Schüle, Die Urgeschichte (forthcoming).

Book reviews

 W. Werner, Studien zur alttestamentlichen Vorstellung vom Plan Jahwes, in JBL 109 (1990): 512-514.
 G. Fleischer, Von Menschenverkäufern, Baschankühen, und Rechtsverkehren and S. Rosenbaum, Amos of Israel (cluster review), in Critical Review of Books in Religion, E. J. Epp, ed. Atlanta: Scholars Press, 1991. pp. 133–136.
 W. Dever, Recent Archaeological Discoveries and Biblical Research, in Interpretation 46 (1992): 197-198.
 R. Ginn, The Present and the Past, J. Wilcox, The Bitterness of Job, and W. Farley, Tragic Vision and Divine Compassion (cluster review), in Perspectives in Religious Studies 18 (1991): 261-264.
 J. Sasson, Jonah, in Horizons in Biblical Theology 13 (1991): 77-78.
 H. Niehr, Der höchste Gott: Alttestamentlicher JHWH-Glaube im Kontext syrisch-kanaanäischer Religion des 1. Jahrtausends v. Chr., in Catholic Biblical Quarterly (= CBQ) 54 (1992): 120-121.
 J. van Ruiten, Een Begin Zonder Einde: De doorwerking van Jesaja 65:17 in de intertestamentaire literatuur en het Nieuwe Testament, in CBQ 54 (1992): 549-550.
 D. H. Bak, Klagender Gott – Klagende Menschen, in CBQ 55 (1993): 108-109.
 B. Bozak, Life 'Anew': A Literary-Theological Study of Jer. 30-31, in CBQ 55 (1993): 324-325.
 Y. Goldman, Prophétie et royauté au retour de l'exil, in CBQ 55 (1993): 758-759.
 R. Albertz, Religionsgeschichte Israels in alttestamentlicher Zeit, in CBQ 56 (1994): 312-314.
 T. Lescow, Das Stufenschema: Untersuchungen zur Struktur alttestamentlicher Texte, in CBQ 56 (1994): 767-768.
 H. Nobel, Gods gedachten tellen: Numerike structuuranalyse en de elf gedachten Gods in Genesis – 2 Koningen, in CBQ 56 (1994): 774-776.
 J. Lundbom, The Early Career of the Prophet Jeremiah, in CBQ 57 (1995): 150-151.
 B. Lang, Eugen Drewermann, interprète de la Bible: Le paradis. Le naissance du Christ, in CBQ 57 (1995): 560-561.
 G. Fischer, Das Trostbüchlein: Text, Komposition un Theologie von Jer 30-31, in Religious Studies Review (= RSR) 21 (1995): 224.
 J. Jeremias, Der Prophet Amos, in JBL 116 (1997): 548-550 (=http://www.bookreviews.org/pdf/2644_1586.pdf).
 R. Bergen, ed., Biblical Hebrew and Discourse Linguistics, in CBQ 58 (1996): 370-372.
 K. Pfisterer Darr, Isaiah's Vision and the Family of God, in RSR 22 (1996): 60.
 Jun-Hee Cha, Micha und Jeremia, in CBQ 59 (1997): 339-340.
 D. Penchansky, The Politics of Biblical Theology, in CBQ 59 (1997): 133-135.
 K. Schmid,  Buchgestalten des Jeremiabuches: Untersuchungen zur Redaktions- und Rezeptionsgeschichte von Jer 30-33 im Kontext des Buches, in CBQ 60 (1998): 344-345.
 D. Rotzoll, Studien zur Redaktion und Komposition des Amosbuches, in Review of Biblical Literature, M. Sweeney, el al, eds. Atlanta: Society of Biblical Literature, 1999. pp. 158–159 (=http://www.bookreviews.org/pdf/2534_1756.pdf).
 B. Zapff, Redaktionsgeschichtliche Studien zum Michabuch im Kontext des Dodekapropheton, in CBQ 61 (1999): 569-570.
 J. P. Fokkelman, Major Poems of the Hebrew Bible, Volume I: Ex. 15, Deut 32, and Job 3: At the Interface of Hermeneutics and Structural Analysis, in RSR 25 (1999): 285.
 C. Seitz and K. Greene-McCreight, eds., Theological Exegesis: Essays in Honor of Brevard S. Childs, in CBQ 62 (2000): 190-91.
 B. Janowski, Stellvertretung: Alttestamentlich Studien zu einem theologischen Grundbegriff, in RSR 24 (1998): 289.
 W. Harrelson, The Ten Commandments and Human Rights, in RevExp 95 (1998): 288-289.
 P. Kelley, Journey to the Land of Promise: Genesis – Deuteronomy, in RevExp 95 (1998): 292.
 K. King, ed., Women and Goddess Traditions: In Antiquity and Today, in RevExp 95 (1998): 296.
 R. Ulmer, trans., Maaserot – Zehnte, Maaser Sheni – Zweiter Zehnt, in RevExp 95 (1998): 293-294.
 G. Ashby, God Out and Meet God: A Commentary on the Book of Exodus, in RevExp 95 (1998): 449.
 F. Gorman, Jr. Divine Presence and Community: A Commentary on the Book of Leviticus, in RevExp 95 (1998): 453.
 T. Longman, III. The Book of Ecclesiastes, in RevExp 95 (1998): 454.
 J. Oswalt, The Book of Isaiah: Chapters 40-66, in RevExp 95 (1998): 456.
 E. Tiffany, The Image of God in Creation, in RevExp 95 (1998): 456-457.
 G. Fackre, The Doctrine of Revelation: A Narrative Interpretation, in RevExp 95 (1998): 458.
 R. Farmer, Beyond the Impasse: The Promise of a Process Hermeneutic, in RevExp 95 (1998): 459.
 A. Porterfield, The Power of Religion: A Comparative Introduction, in RevExp 95 (1998): 461-462.
 H. Utzschneider, Michas Reise in die Zeit, in CBQ 62 (2000): 739-740.
 J. Watts, Reading Law: The Rhetorical Shaping of the Pentateuch, in RevExp 97 (2000): 107-08.
 J. Eaton, Mysterious Messengers: A Course on Hebrew Prophecy From Amos Onwards, in RevExp 97 (2000): 514.
 F. Holmgren, The Old Testament and the Significance of Jesus: Embracing Change – Maintaining Christian Identity, in RevExp 97 (2000): 514-515.
 G. Fee, Listening to the Spirit in the Text, in RevExp 97 (2000): 516-517.
 J. G. Millar, Now Choose Life: Theology and Ethics in Deuteronomy, in RevExp 97 (2000): 513-514.
 P. D. Miller, Israelite Religion and Biblical Theology: Collected Essays, in RSR (2000).
 Francis I. Andersen and David Noel Freedman, Micah: A New Translation With Introduction and Commentary, in CBQ 63 (2001): 507-508.
 E. Ben Zvi, Micah in CBQ 63 (2001): 132-34.
 J. R. Lundbom, Jeremiah 1-20: A New Translation With Introduction and Commentary in Interpretation 55 (2001): 316.
 R. S. Wallace, The Story of Joseph and the Family of Jacob in RevExp 98 (2001): 280-81.
 J. L. Crenshaw, The Psalms: An Introduction in RevExp 98 (2001): 281-82.
 D. Ewert, How to Understand the Bible, in RevExp 98 (2001): 442-43.
 R. J. Coggins, Joel and Amos, in RevExp 98 (2001): 445-47.
 J. Blenkinsopp, Isaiah 1-39, in RevExp 98 (2001): 444-45.
 K. Jobes and M. Silva, Invitation to the Septuagint, in RevExp 98 (2001): 443-44.
 M. Fox, Proverbs 1-9, in RevExp 99 (2002): 110-11.
 W. Brueggemann, Deuteronomy, Abingdon Old Testament Commentaries, in Interpretation 56 (2002): 328.
 D. Gowan, Daniel, Abingdon Old Testament Commentaries, in RevExp 99 (2002): 277-8.
 J. Barton, Joel and Obadiah, The Old Testament Library, in RevExp 99 (2002): 279-80.
 T. Longman III, Song of Songs, The New International Commentary on the Old Testament, in RevExp 99 (2002): 284-85.
 G. Fee, To What End Exegesis? in RevExp 99 (2002): 287.
 W. Janzen, Exodus, Believers Bible Commentary, in RevExp 99 (2002): 455-56.
 W. Brueggemann, Ichabod Toward Home: The Journey of God's Glory, in RevExp 99 (2002): 458.
 P. Quinn-Miscall, Reading Isaiah: Poetry and Vision, in RevExp 99 (2002): 460-61.
 C. Seitz, Figured Out: Typology and Providence in Christian Scripture, in RevExp 99 (2002): 456-57.
 V. Matthews, Social World of the Hebrew Prophets, in RevExp 99 (2002): 461.
 K. R. Nemet-Nejat, Daily Life in Ancient Mesopotamia, in RevExp (forthcoming).
 Stephan Davis, The Antithesis of the Ages: Paul's Reconfiguration of the Torah in RevExp 99 (2002): 623-24.
 Paul Hooker, First and Second Chronicles, in RevExp 99 (2002): 625.
 David L. Petersen, The Prophetic Literature: An Introduction, in RevExp 99 (2002): 627.
 "Reading the Prophets," a cluster review of A. Heschel, The Prophets; W. Brueggeman, The Prophetic Imagination; and C. Dempsey, The Prophets, in Christian Reflection (2003): 82-86.
 Steven Tuell, First and Second Chronicles, in RevExp 100 (2003): 131-132.
 Mark S. Smith, Untold Stories: The Bible and Ugaritic Studies in the Twentieth Century, in RevExp 100 (2003): 136-37.
 Duane A. Garrett, A Modern Grammar for Classical Hebrew, in RevExp 100 (2003): 135-36.
 Jonathan Goldstein, Peoples of an Almighty God  Competing Religions in the Ancient World in RevExp 100 (2003): 283-84.
 Wojciech Pikor, La Comunicazione Profetica alla Luce di Ez 2-3, in CBQ 66 (2004): 299-300.
 Martin Kessler, Battle of the Gods: The God of Israel Versus Marduk of Babylon: A Literary/Theological Interpretation of Jeremiah 50-51 in RBL (http://www.bookreviews.org/pdf/4019_4302.pdf).
 Philippe Guillaume, Waiting for Josiah: The Judges, in Perspectives in Religious Studies 33 (2006): 512-513.
 Louis Stulman, Jeremiah, Abingdon Old Testament Commentaries, in Int 60 (2006): 97-98.
 Abraham Joshua Heschel, Heavenly Torah: As Refracted through the Generations, in Perspectives in Religious Studies 33 (2006): 511-512.
 Bruce A. Little, A Creation-Order Theodicy: God and Gratuitous Evil, in RevExp 102 (2005): 532-33.
 J. Neusner, Rabbinic Literature: An Essential Guide in RevExp 102 (2005): 536-38.
 Carl E. Braaten and Christopher R. Seitz, eds., I Am the Lord Your God: Christian Reflections on the Ten Commandments in RevExp 102 (2005): 743-45.
 Jacob Neusner, Transformations in Ancient Judaism: Textual Evidence for Creative Responses to Crisis in RevExp 103 (2006): 638-640.
 Gary N. Knoppers, I Chronicles 1-9: A New Translation with Introduction and Commentary, AB 12; I Chronicles 10-20: A New Translation with Introduction and Commentary, AB 12A in RevExp 103 (2006): 836-39.
 Athalya Brenner, ed., Are we Amused?  Humour About Women in the Biblical Worlds, in PRS (forthcoming).
 Elisabeth Tetlow, Women, Crime, and Punishment in Ancient Law and Society: Vol. 1, The Ancient Near East in PRS 34 (2007): 241-245.
 Walter Brueggemann, Solomon: Israel's Ironic Icon of Human Achievement in Int (2006).
 Cheryl Anderson, Women, Ideology and Violence: Critical Theory and the Construction of Gender in the Book of the Covenant and the Deuteronomic Law in PRS 34 (2007): 241-245.
 William Yarchin, History of Biblical Interpretation: A Reader in RevExp 103 (2006): 428-29.
 Kiss, Jenö,  Die Klage Gottes und des Propheten: Ihre Rolle in der Komposition und Redaktion von Jer 11-12, 14-15 and 18 in RBL 3 (2007) (http://www.bookreviews.org/pdf/5346_5636.pdf).
 Mary Shields, Circumscribing the Prostitute: The Rhetorics of Intertextuality, Metaphor and Gender in Jeremiah 3.1-4.4 in RBL 8 (2008): 198-200 (=http://www.bookreviews.org/pdf/4503_4563.pdf).
 Waltke, B, A Commentary on Micah in Int 62 (2008): 334-35.
 Hjelde, Sigurd, Sigmund Mowinckel und seine Zeit: Leben und Werk eines norwegischen Alttestamentlers in RBL 9 (207) (http://www.bookreviews.org/pdf/5794_6117.pdf).
 Neil B. MacDonald, Metaphysics and the God of Israel: Systematic Theology of the Old and New Testaments in RevExp 104 (2007): 823-825.
 Georg Fischer, Jeremia: Der Stand der theologischen Diskussion in CBQ 70 (2008): 339-341.
 Patrick Miller, The Way of the Lord: Essays in Old Testament Theology in RevExp 105 (2008): 153-54.
 Brian Block, Singing the Ethos of God in RevExp 105 (2008): 519-521.
 Susan Niditch, Judges: A Commentary in RevExp (forthcoming).
 J. Gordon Harris, et al., Joshua, Judges, Ruth in RevExp (forthcoming).
 Kenneth Berding and Jonathan Lunde, eds., Three Views on the New Testament Use of the Old Testament in RevExp 106 (2009): 275-77.
 T. Longman III, Jeremiah, Lamentations in RevExp 106 (2009): 501-02.
 R. Smend, From Astruc to Zimmerli: Old Testament Scholarship in Three Centuries in CBQ 71 (2009): 149-150.
 J. Crenshaw, Prophetic Conflict: Its Effect on Israelite Religion in RevExp 106 (2009): 635-37.
 H. Bezzel, Die Konfessionen Jeremias: Eine redaktionsgeschichtliche Studie in CBQ 71 (2009): 600-602.
 L. Allen, Jeremiah: A Commentary in Int 64 (2010): 86-88.
 Gary A. Anderson, Sin: A History in Int 65 (2011): 206-208.
 Reinhard Kratz and Herrmann Speickermann, eds., Zeit und Ewigkeit als Raum göttlichen Handelns in CBQ 72 (2010): 630-631.
 T. Niklas, K. Zamfir, and H. Braun, eds. Theologies of Creation in Early Judaism and Ancient Christianity: In Honour of Hans Klein in CBQ 74 (2012): 411-13.
 W. Brown, The Seven Pillars of Creation: The Bible, Science, and the Ecology of Wonder in RevExp 108 (2011): 110-111.
 Lemche, N.P. The Old Testament between Theology and History: A Critical Survey in RevExp 108 (2011): 320-321 (with Kathryn Camp).
 Dearman, J. Andrew. The Book of Hosea in Int 66 (2012): 211-212.
 Spinks, D. Christopher. The Bible and the Crisis of Meaning: Debates on the Theological Interpretation of Scriptures in RevExp 108 (2011): 606-608.
 Seitz, Christopher D.  The Goodly Fellowship of the Prophets: The Achievement of Association in Canon Formation in Journal of Hebrew Scriptures 12 (2012). (http://www.jhsonline.org/reviews/reviews_new/review596.htm)
 Jackson, Melissa A.  Comedy and Feminist Interpretation of the Hebrew Bible: A Subversive Collaboration in RevExp 110 (2013): 142-144.
 Mobley, Gregory.  The Return of the Chaos Monster — And Other Backstories of the Bible in Int 67 (2013): 438-239.
 Segal, Alan F. Sinning in the Hebrew Bible: How the Worst Stories Speak for Its Truth in Int (forthcoming).
 Humphreys, W. Lee. The Character of God in the Book of Genesis: A Narrative Appraisal in RevExp (forthcoming).
 Anderson, Cheryl B. Ancient Laws & Contemporary Controversies: The Need for Inclusive Biblical Interpretation in RevExp (forthcoming).

Papers and lectures

 "The Figure of Lady Jerusalem: Identification, Deification and Personification of Cities in the Ancient Near East" (1991 SBL Southeastern Regional Meeting, Atlanta).
 "Lady Zion's Alter Egos: Isaiah 47:1-15 and 57:6-13 as Structural Counterparts" (1991 SBL Annual Meeting, Kansas City).
 "The City of Chaos and the New Jerusalem: Isaiah 24-27 in Context" (1992 SBL Annual Meeting, San Francisco).
 "Confessional Materials in Jeremiah 7-10" (1993 SBL Annual Meeting, Washington, DC).
 1993 Russell Bradley Jones Lecturer, Carson Newman College.
 "Liturgical Materials in Jeremiah 7-20: The Question of the Genre of a Prophetic Book" (1994 SBL Annual Meeting, Chicago).
 Response to P. Willey, "The Servant of YHWH and Daughter Zion: Alternating Visions of YHWH's Community" (1995 SBL Annual Meeting, Philadelphia).
 "A Joel-Layer of Redaction in the Book of the Twelve?  A Response to J. Nogalski's Redaction Critical Assessment" (panel presentation, Formation of the Book of the Twelve Consultation, 1995 SBL Annual Meeting, Philadelphia).
 "Intertextuality, Micah, and the Book of the Twelve: A Question of Method" (1996 SBL Annual Meeting, New Orleans).
 2001 Keynote Address, Lasker Sacred Music Festival, Lasker, NC
 "Obadiah-Jonah-Micah in Canonical Context: The Nature of Prophetic Literature and Hermeneutics" (The Book of the Twelve Prophets Section, SBL Annual Meeting,Washington, DC, November 19, 2006)
 "Dominion Returns to Jerusalem: An Examination of Developments in the Kingship and Zion Traditions as Reflected in the Book of the Twelve with Particular Attention to Micah 4-5" (paper read at the "Perspectives on the Formation of the Book of the Twelve" conference at the University of Münster, January 14–16, 2011).
 "Die (Wieder)Herstellung der Ordnung: Sünde und Aus-der-Ordnung-Sein nach der priesterlichen Auffassung und in den Lehren und Taten Jesu" (invited guest lecture in the "Götterbilder – Gottesbilder – Weltbilder" graduate colloquium at the University of Göttingen, June 21, 2012).

Editor

 W. Brueggemann, 1 and 2 Kings, Smyth & Helwys Bible Commentary. Macon: Smyth & Helwys, 2000.
 T. Fretheim, Jeremiah, Smyth & Helwys Bible Commentary. Macon: Smyth & Helwys, 2002.
 L. Bailey, Leviticus-Numbers, Smyth & Helwys Bible Commentary. Macon: Smyth & Helwys, 2005.
 S. Balentine, Job, Smyth & Helwys Bible Commentary. Macon: Smyth & Helwys, 2007.
 J. Nogalski, The Minor Prophets, Smyth & Helwys Bible Commentary. Macon: Smyth & Helwys, forthcoming.
 J. Sanderson, Judges, Smyth & Helwys Bible Commentary. Macon: Smyth & Helwys, forthcoming.
 Editorial board member, Review and Expositor.
 General editor, Reading the Old Testament, Macon: Smyth & Helwys, forthcoming.
 Issue editor of Review and Expositor volumes on Genesis and Song of Songs, RE 105/3 (2008) (both with Nancy de-Classe Walford) and "Left Behind."
 Issue editor, Apocalypse Now? RE 106/1 (2009).
 Crenshaw, James.  Job, ROT (Macon: Smyth & Helwys, 2011).
 Managing editor, Review & Expositor. 2010–2011.
 Bos, Johanna.  1 and 2 Samuel, Reading the Old Testament (=ROT). Macon: Smyth & Helwys, 2012.
 Fretheim, Terrance.  Minor Prophets I, ROT. Macon: Smyth & Helwys, 2013.
 Tuell, Steven.  Minor Prophets II, ROT. Macon: Smyth & Helwys, 2013.
 Sweeeney, Marvin.  Ezekiel, ROT. Macon: Smyth & Helwys, 2013.
 Cook, Stephen.  Deuteronomy, ROT. Macon: Smyth & Helwys, 2014.
 Johnstone, William.  Exodus, Smyth & Helwys Bible Commentary (=SHBC). Macon: Smyth & Helwys, 2013.
 O'Connor, Kathleen.  Genesis, SHBC. Macon: Smyth & Helwys, forthcoming.
 Associate editor, Review & Expositor. 2011–2012.

References

1957 births
Old Testament scholars
Academic journal editors
Samford University alumni
Southern Baptist Theological Seminary alumni
University of Zurich alumni
Living people
People from Fort Payne, Alabama